Events in the year 1918 in Germany.

Incumbents

National level

Head of State
 Kaiser – Wilhelm II, abdicated 9 November
 Republican (from 9 November) – vacant

Head of Government
 Chancellor (Imperial) - Georg von Hertling to 30 September, then from 3 October Prince Maximilian of Baden to 9 November
 Republican – from 9 November Friedrich Ebert, "Head of Government"

State level

Kingdoms
 King of Bavaria – Ludwig III of Bavaria abdicated 7 November
 King of Prussia – Kaiser Wilhelm II, abdicated 9 November
 King of Saxony – Frederick Augustus III of Saxony, abdicated 13 November
 King of Württemberg – William II of Württemberg, abdicated 30 November

Grand Duchies
 Grand Duke of Baden – Frederick II, abdicated 22 November
 Grand Duke of Hesse – Ernest Louis, abdicated 9 November
 Grand Duke of Mecklenburg-Schwerin - Frederick Francis IV, abdicated 14 November
 Grand Duke of Mecklenburg-Strelitz – Adolphus Frederick VI, died 23 November, thereafter vacant
 Grand Duke of Oldenburg – Frederick Augustus II, abdicated 11 November
 Grand Duke of Saxe-Weimar-Eisenach – William Ernest, abdicated 9 November

Principalities
 Schaumburg-Lippe – Adolf II, Prince of Schaumburg-Lippe, abdicated 15 November
 Schwarzburg-Rudolstadt – Günther Victor, Prince of Schwarzburg, abdicated 22 November
 Schwarzburg-Sondershausen – Günther Victor, Prince of Schwarzburg, abdicated 22 November
 Principality of Lippe – Leopold IV, Prince of Lippe, abdicated 12 November
 Reuss Elder Line – Heinrich XXIV, Prince Reuss of Greiz (with Heinrich XXVII, Prince Reuss Younger Line, as regent), abdicated November
 Reuss Younger Line – Heinrich XXVII, Prince Reuss Younger Line, abdicated November
 Waldeck and Pyrmont – Friedrich, Prince of Waldeck and Pyrmont, abdicated 13 November

Duchies
 Duke of Anhalt – Frederick II, Duke of Anhalt to 21 April, then Eduard, Duke of Anhalt to 13 September, then Joachim Ernst, Duke of Anhalt (with Prince Aribert of Anhalt regent), abdicated 12 November
 Duke of Brunswick – Ernest Augustus, Duke of Brunswick, abdicated 8 November
 Duke of Saxe-Altenburg – Ernst II, Duke of Saxe-Altenburg, abdicated 13 November
 Duke of Saxe-Coburg and Gotha – Charles Edward, Duke of Saxe-Coburg and Gotha, abdicated 14 November
 Duke of Saxe-Meiningen – Bernhard III, Duke of Saxe-Meiningen, abdicated 10 November

Colonial Governor
 German East Africa (Deutsch-Ostafrika) – Heinrich Schnee to 14 November, although most of territory under Allied occupation.

Events

February 
 Date unknown - Arthur Scherbius applies to patent the Enigma machine.

October 
 Kaiser Wilhelm II of Germany appoints Max von Baden Chancellor of Germany.
 King Ferdinand I of Bulgaria abdicates in the wake of the Bulgarian military collapse in WWI. He is succeeded by his son, Boris III.
 4 October
 Wilhelm II of Germany forms a new more liberal government to sue for peace.

November 
 3 November
 German Revolution: Sailors in the German fleet at Kiel mutiny and throughout northern Germany soldiers and workers begin to establish revolutionary councils on the Russian soviet model.
 9 November
 Kaiser Wilhelm II of Germany abdicates and chooses to live in exile in the Netherlands.
 Proclamation of German Republic by Philipp Scheidemann in Berlin on the Reichstag balcony.

 11 November
 End of WWI and Armistice with Germany (Compiègne): Germany signs an armistice agreement with the Allies between 5:12 AM and 5:20 AM in Marshal Foch's railroad car in Compiègne Forest in France. It becomes official on the 11th hour of the 11th day of the 11th month.

Born 
 10 January - Harry Merkel, German racing driver (died 1995)
 3 March - Fritz Thiedemann, German equestrian (died 2000)
 20 March - Bernd Alois Zimmermann, German composer (died 1970)
 28 April - Karl-Eduard von Schnitzler, German journalist (died 2001)
 24 May - Katharina Szelinski-Singer, German sculptor (died 2010)
 1 August - Artur Brauner, German film producer (died 2019)
 4 August - Claus Holm, German actor (died 1996)
 22 September – Hans Scholl, German White Rose resistance member (died 1943)
 10 October - Werner Dollinger, German politician (died 2008)
 20 October - Werner Maihofer, German jurist and politician (died 2009)
 26 October - Dietrich von Bothmer, German art historian (died 2009)
 5 November - Gisela Arendt, German swimmer (died 1969)
 8 November - Hermann Zapf, German typeface designer and calligrapher (died 2015)
 10 November – Ernst Otto Fischer, chemist, Nobel Prize in Chemistry (died 2007)
 23 December – Helmut Schmidt, German politician (died 2015)

Deaths

January 
 6 January – Georg Cantor, German mathematician (born 1845)
 7 January – Julius Wellhausen, German biblical scholar (born 1844)
 9 January – Max Ritter von Müller, German World War I fighter ace (killed in action) (born 1887)
 10 January – August Oetker, German entrepreneur (born 1862)
 21 January – Emil Jellinek, German automobile entrepreneur (born 1853)

February 
 23 February – Adolphus Frederick VI, Grand Duke of Mecklenburg-Strelitz, nobleman (born 1882)

March 
 9 March – Frank Wedekind, German playwright (born 1864)
 10 March 
 Hans-Joachim Buddecke, German flying ace (killed in action) (born 1890)
 Eugen von Zimmerer, German prosecutor, attorney and (born 1843)
 15 March – Adolf Ritter von Tutschek, German fighter ace (killed in action) (born 1891)
 17 March – Hans Bethge, German World War I flying ace (born 1890)
 30 March – Richard Beitzen, German World War I naval officer (born 1882)

April 
 4 April – Hermann Cohen, German philosopher (born 1842)
 20 April – Karl Ferdinand Braun, German inventor, physicist and Nobel laureate in physics (born 1850)
 21 April 
 Friedrich II, Duke of Anhalt (born 1856)
 Manfred von Richthofen, German fighter pilot (born 1892)
 27 April – Oscar Troplowitz, German pharmacist and entrepreneur (born 1863)

May 
 14 May - Max Wilms, German surgeon and physician (born 1867)
 28 May - Richard Assmann, German meteorologist and physician (born 1845)

June 
 24 June - Julius Kollmann, German anatomist and zoologist (born 1834)

July
 7 July - Arno Bieberstein, German swimmer (born 1884)
 9 July – Hans am Ende, German Impressionist painter (born 1864)

August 
 22 August – Korbinian Brodmann, German neurologist and psychiatrist (born 1868)
 30 August – Wilhelm Kühne, German World War I flying ace (born 1888)

September
 10 September - Carl Peters, German colonial ruler, explorer, politician and author (born 1856)
 13 September – Eduard, Duke of Anhalt, nobleman (born 1861).
 23 September - Georg Theodor August Gaffky, German  bacteriologist (born 1850)
 28 September - Georg Simmel, German philosopher and sociologist (born 1858)

October 
 9 October - Hanns Braun, German athlete (born 1886)
 18 October – Fritz Otto Brenert, German World War I flying ace (born 1893)
 26 October – Olivier Freiherr von Beaulieu-Marconnay, German World War I flying ace (born 1898)

November 
 4 November - Hans Graf von Schwerin-Löwitz, German politician (born 1847)
 5 November:
 Wolfgang Zenker, German World War I naval officer (born 1898)
 Bruno Heinemann, German World War I naval officer (born 1880)
 9 November - Albert Ballin, German shipping magnate (born 1857)
 23 November - Fritz von Below, German general (born 1853)
 22 December – Hermann Theodor Simon, German physicist (born 1870)

References

 
Years of the 20th century in Germany
Germany
Germany